Mure may refer to:

Places
 Mure, Kagawa, Japan, a former town
 Mure, Nagano, Japan, a former village
 Mure (Raška), Serbia, a village
 La Mure, a commune in the French department of Isère

Other uses
 Mure (surname)
 Clan Muir, also spelled Mure, a Scottish clan
 Mure baronets, an extinct title in the Baronetage of Nova Scotia
 Mure language, an extinct language of Bolivia
 Chemin de fer de La Mure, a historic electrified railway in France
 Mure Station, a railway station in Iizuna, Nagano, Japan

See also
 Muir (disambiguation)
 Murre, a kind of bird
 Murree